is a Japanese chef in Florida. He has a large social media following with over 2 million subscribers on YouTube which he garnered from hosting multiple segments on cooking. Terada sometimes uses budget ingredients including Big Macs and ingredients from Walmart. Terada currently holds the Guinness World record on most number of carrots sliced blindfolded in 30 seconds.

Career
Terada learned the basics of sushi at age 10 from his father. From 1987 to 1989 he attended RKC Culinary School in Kochi, Japan. He was known for his speed with the knife and attention to detail. After graduating he served under Master Chef Kondo at Yuzuan restaurant in Kochi, Japan from 1989 to 1992. Kondo is a master of Kansai style cooking. Terada earned the title of master sushi chef after becoming a head sushi chef. 

Terada has a large fan base on social media from hosting segments such as "Will It Sushi" on his YouTube channel "Diaries of a Master Sushi Chef". By 2015 Terada had built up an online following with over 40 million views on his channel. He turned a Big Mac and fries into sushi. In 2016, he turned donuts from Dunkin Donuts and KFC chicken into sushi. In 2017, he broke the Guinness record of most sliced carrots blindfolded in 30 seconds. He cut 88 slices of carrots 38 more than the previous record. In 2018, Terada had over 1 million subscribers on YouTube and over 100 million views. By 2019, he had over 1.5 million subscribers.  By 2022, August 8, he had over 2 million subscribers.

References

External links

1968 births
Living people
Japanese chefs
Sushi